Corymbia maculata, commonly known as spotted gum, is a species of medium-sized to tall tree that is endemic to eastern Australia. It has smooth, mottled bark, lance-shaped to curved adult leaves, flower buds usually in groups of three, white flowers and urn-shaped or barrel-shaped fruit.

Description
It has smooth mottled pinkish grey or bluish grey, often dimpled bark that is shed in small, irregular flakes. Flowering occurs from March to September and the flowers are white.

Corymbia citriodora and C. henryi are similar to C. maculata but have a more northerly distribution extending into Queensland. The adult leaves of C. citriodora are slightly narrower and those of C. henryii wider than those of C. maculata.

Taxonomy and naming
Spotted gum was first formally described in 1844 by William Jackson Hooker in his book Icones Plantarum, and given the name Eucalyptus maculata. In 1995, Ken Hill and Lawrie Johnson changed the name to Corymbia maculata. The specific name maculata is derived from the Latin word maculatus, meaning "spotted", referring to the spotted pattern on the bark.

Distribution
Corymbia maculata is a widespread species in open forest from near Bega and north along the coast of New South Wales to near Taree. There is a disjunct population near Orbost in Victoria. It often forms dense, pure stands in forest and often grows on moderately infertile soil. The species is naturalised in Western Australia and South Australia, and in areas of New South Wales and Victoria outside its natural range.

Ecology
The flowers of this species attract honeyeaters.

Uses

Use in horticulture
Spotted gum is often used for planting in parks and as a street tree, however its mature size makes it unsuitable for most home gardens.

Timber
The timber of spotted gum is strong, and exploited in a range of construction uses. It is used in flooring although the pale sapwood is susceptible to Lyctus borer unless treated.

See also
 List of Corymbia species

References

External links 
tropical.theferns.info / Corymbia maculata
youtube.com / OLD BLOTCHY, 18 Aug 2013

maculata
Trees of Australia
Myrtales of Australia
Flora of New South Wales
Flora of Victoria (Australia)
Drought-tolerant trees
Plants described in 1844